Mount Pleasant station may refer to:

Mount Pleasant station (Brant County, Ontario), a former railway station in Brant County, Ontario, Canada
Mount Pleasant station (Iowa), in Mount Pleasant, Iowa, United States
Mount Pleasant station (Metro-North), in Mount Pleasant, Westchester County, New York, United States
Mount Pleasant station (Toronto), a future light rail station in Toronto, Ontario, Canada
Mount Pleasant station (SkyTrain), a future rapid transit station in Vancouver, British Columbia, Canada
Mount Pleasant station (Ulster and Delaware Railroad), in Mount Pleasant, Ulster County, New York, United States
Mount Pleasant GO Station in Brampton, Ontario, Canada
Mount Pleasant MRT station, a future station in Singapore
Mountpleasant railway station, a former railway station in County Louth, Ireland

Other uses
Mount Pleasant (disambiguation)